St. Andrew's United Church of Cairo is an international Christian church in Egypt. It has an English-speaking international congregation, an Egyptian congregation and five refugee congregations. Its church building was completed in 1908. It is located at 38 26 July St. between Ramses and Galaa streets, just above the Nasser metro stop in downtown Cairo. English worship services are held at 10 am on Fridays.

St. Andrew's also provides St. Andrew's Refugee Services. Since 1978, St. Andrew's congregation has played a role in educating and advocating among African refugees in Egypt. Most of the refugees fled their homes in Sudan, but some also come from as far away as Eritrea, Somalia and Iraq. The African refugee ministry began as part of the ongoing ministry of St. Andrew's United Church of Cairo. Now it is separately constituted and has its own board, though local members of St. Andrew's also volunteer with the Refugee Services. The refugees themselves are involved in the administration of the program whenever possible.

Programs
 The Children's Education Program has six elementary education classes and five teen classes, serving 220 refugee children, with a waiting list of 75 children. The school offers a basic education curriculum and conflict resolution training. A hot meal, milk and fruit are provided each child daily.
 The Adult Education Program offers courses to improve refugees’ employment options, such as English, business and accounting, and computers. A practical life skills course teaches parenting skills and conflict resolution classes. The program serves 600 students.
 The African Refugee Cooperative teaches arts and crafts production and markets the crafts to generate income for 30 persons. 
 The Refugee Legal Aid Office provides information on resettlement to the USA via the "Direct Access" program for Iraqi refugees and is now offering its services to other refugee groups by referral.
 The Youth Leadership, Education and Access to Development provides educational services, sports activities and hip hop music therapy to at-risk Sudanese refugee youth.

See also
Sudanese refugees in Egypt
Coptic Orthodox Churches in Egypt

External links
Saint Andrew's United Church of Cairo official website

Churches in Cairo
Schools in Egypt
Churches completed in 1908
1908 establishments in Egypt
20th-century churches in Egypt